Tatiana Al-Najar (born May 11, 1967) is a Jordanian Olympic table tennis player. She represented Jordan in 2000 Summer Olympics in Sydney. She did not participate in any other Summer Olympics, and she failed to qualify for the 2012 Summer Olympics in London, however, she won Arab Table Tennis Championships in the next year.

Olympic participation

Sydney 2000
Al-Najar was the oldest participant for Jordan in that tournament aged 33 years and 130 days then.

Table tennis – Women's Singles – Preliminary Round

Honors
Arab Table Tennis Championships Amman 2012 – Women's Singles: Champion

References

1967 births
Living people
Table tennis players at the 2000 Summer Olympics
Jordanian female table tennis players
Olympic table tennis players of Jordan
20th-century Jordanian women